Nandigam is a census village in Therlam mandal, Vizianagaram district of Andhra Pradesh.

Demography

Economy 
Nandigam's economy is primarily agrarian. Rice, Sugarcane are major crops. Cultivation of Maize is fast picking up. Pulses like green gram and black gram are cultivated as rice fallow crops. Sesame and groundnut are major oil seed crops grown in the village. Most of the households depend on allied activities like dairying and domestic poultry for additional income.

Jaggery production in sugarcane harvesting season is small scale informal enterprise activity providing local employment during lean agricultural season for labourers.

Society and Culture 
Most of the social and cultural characteristics are in many ways related to its predominantly agrarian character. The newer generations, being exposed to the rest of the world academically, professionally and culturally, both by physical travel and social media are causing new changes in society and culture. But the cultural beliefs of the villages are still deeply rooted in its agrarian character. Asiramma is the village deity which the people believe as their protector from evil and good physical and mental health and wealth can be obtained by worshipping her. Animal sacrifice particularly of domestic chicken and goat is still practiced.

Communication and Connectivity 
Nandigam is located on SH-109 which connects the historic town of Bobbili with Therlam junction. SH-109 is alternative route to connect these two points bypassing the Ramabhadrapuram junction located on SH-4, which connects Andhra-Odisha border from Kuneru to NH-16 junction at Chilakapalem.

Current road condition of SH-109 is that it is a fully paved asphalt road without much damage but many sharp curves.

The nearest railhead to Nandigam is 18 km away Bobbili Junction (VBL) of ECoR located on Vizianagarm-Raipur main line and 25 km away Cheepurupalle (CPP) also of ECoR located on Chennai-Kolkata main line.

Telecom and Internet 
Nandigam belongs to Andhra Pradesh telecom circle. Despite being a small village, Nandigam hosts two cellular towers: one by Indus Towers hosting Bharti Airtel [2G & 4G] and VI [2G, 3G & 4G] and the other by state run BSNL [2G & 3G]. AP fibernet, Andhra Pradesh state government's own Tri-service provider, laid OFCs but not operational at consumer level.

References

Villages in Vizianagaram district